Termoelektrana (Cyrillic: Термоелектрана) is a village in the municipality of Kakanj, Bosnia and Herzegovina. The name means "thermal power station", due to thermal power station located in the village.

Demographics 
According to the 2013 census, its population was 131.

References

Populated places in Kakanj